Microcionidae is a family of marine demosponges.

Subdivisions
The following genera are recognized within the family Microcionidae:
 Subfamily Microcioninae Carter 1875
 Clathria  Schmidt, 1862
 Echinochalina Thiele, 1903
 Holopsamma Carter, 1885
 Pandaros Duchassaing & Michelotti, 1864
 Subfamily Ophlitaspongiinae de Laubenfels, 1936
 Antho  Gray, 1867
 Artemisina Vosmaer, 1885
 Echinoclathria Carter, 1885
 Ophlitaspongia Bowerbank, 1866
 Sigmeurypon Topsent, 1928

References 

Poecilosclerida
Sponge families